Conor Morrison may refer to:

 Conor Morrison (Gaelic footballer) (born  1996), Donegal player
 Conor Morrison (ice hockey) (born 1989), Augsburger Panther player
 Conner Morrison (swimmer), British swimmer who competed in the 2018 World Para Swimming European Championships – Men's 100 metres breaststroke